Deloncle Bay is a bay, 1.5 nautical miles (3 km) long, indenting the northwest coast of Kyiv Peninsula in Graham Land between Loubat Point and Glandaz Point, and opening on Lemaire Channel opposite Booth Island. It was discovered by the Belgian Antarctic Expedition, 1897–99. Recharted by the French Antarctic Expedition, 1903–05, it was named by Jean-Baptiste Charcot for François Deloncle, a French diplomat.

References

 SCAR Composite Gazetteer of Antarctica.

Bays of Graham Land
Graham Coast